Arblade-le-Bas is a commune in the Gers department in southwestern France.

Geography 
Arblade-le-Bas is located in the canton of Adour-Gersoise and in the arrondissement of Mirande.

The commune is bordered by four other communes: Vergoignan to the northwest, Luppé-Violles to the northeast, Lelin-Lapujolle to the east, and finally by Barcelonne-du-Gers to the southwest.

Population

See also
Communes of the Gers department

References

Communes of Gers